Alexandros Evgenios Gounas (born 3 October 1989) is a Greek water polo player. He is member of the Greece men's national water polo team since 2008 and won a bronze medal at the 16th FINA World Championships and competed at the 2016 Summer Olympics. He plays for Greek powerhouse Olympiacos, with whom he won the 2017–18 LEN Champions League in Genoa. Moreover in his collection are 6 Greek Championships and 6 Greek Cups in which four times voted Most Valuable Player. (2011-2012 NC Vouliagmeni),(2013-2014 Olympiacos),(2017-2018 Olympiacos),(2018-2019 Olympiacos).

Honours

Club
Vouliagmeni
Greek Championship: 2011–12
Greek Cup: 2011–12
Olympiacos
LEN Champions League: 2017–18 ; runners-up: 2015–16, 2018–19
Greek Championship: 2013–14, 2014–15, 2015–16
Greek Cup: 2013–14, 2014–15, 2015–16, 2017–18, 2018–19, 2019–20
Greek Super Cup: 2018, 2019

National team
  Silver Medal in 2018 Mediterranean Games Tarragona
  Bronze Medal in 2013 Mediterranean Games, Mersin
  Bronze Medal in 2015 World Championship Kazan
  Bronze Medal in 2016 World League Huizhou
 4th place in 2016 European Championship 
 Belgrade
 4th place in 2017 World Championship 
 Budapest
 6th place in 2016 Olympic Games, Rio

Awards
Greek Championship MVP: 2011–12 with Vouliagmeni, 2013–14, 2017–18, 2018–19, 2019–20 with Olympiacos
Greek Championship Top Scorer: 2020–21, 2021–22 with Apollon Smyrnis

See also
 List of World Aquatics Championships medalists in water polo

References

External links

 

Greek male water polo players
Olympiacos Water Polo Club players
Living people
Place of birth missing (living people)
1989 births
World Aquatics Championships medalists in water polo
Mediterranean Games silver medalists for Greece
Mediterranean Games bronze medalists for Greece
Mediterranean Games medalists in water polo
Competitors at the 2013 Mediterranean Games
Competitors at the 2018 Mediterranean Games
Water polo players from Athens